Saint-Romain-en-Gier is a commune in the Rhône department in eastern France.
It lies on both sides of the Gier river

See also
Communes of the Rhône department

References

Communes of Rhône (department)